The following lists events that happened during 2014 in the Czech Republic.

Incumbents
President: Miloš Zeman
Prime Minister: Jiří Rusnok (until 29 January), Bohuslav Sobotka (starting 29 January)

Events

January
 January 1 - Jamal al-Jamal, a Palestinian ambassador to the Czech Republic, is killed in an explosion near his home in Prague.
 January 29 - A new coalition government is sworn in, led by Bohuslav Sobotka and consisting of the Social Democrats, the liberalist ANO 2011 and the Christian Democrats.

May
 May 21 - Ten men convicted for producing poisoned alcohol that killed more than 30 people in 2012 have been sentenced to prison by a court in the Czech Republic, including 2 life sentences.

References

 
2010s in the Czech Republic
Czech Republic
Years of the 21st century in the Czech Republic
Czech Republic